Lawrence Laurent (March 9, 1925 – August 1, 2020) was an American radio and television critic for The Washington Post from 1951 to 1982. He also taught at American University and George Washington University.

References

1925 births
2020 deaths
American television critics
People from Alexandria, Virginia
People from Monroe, Louisiana
University of Virginia alumni